Irene Burillo Escorihuela was the defending champion but lost in the first round to Christina McHale.

Tatjana Maria won the title, defeating Alycia Parks in the final, 6–4, 4–6, 6–2.

Seeds

Draw

Finals

Top half

Bottom half

References

Main Draw

Georgia's Rome Tennis Open - Singles